The 2019 Florida Mayhem season was the second season of the Florida Mayhem's existence in the Overwatch League and the team's second season under head coach Vytis "Mineral" Lasaitis.

The Mayhem looked to improve from their 2018 campaign, when they only amassed seven wins. After finishing Stage 1 with only one win, the Mayhem announced their intention to implement an all-Korean team and fired two coaches, including head coach Mineral. The team's struggles continued in Stage 2, as they did not win a single match. Prior to Stage 3, the Mayhem's all-Korean overhaul continued, as they made several roster changes. Florida hired Oh "Unread" Nam-hun amidst a one-win Stage 3 as the team's new head coach. The Mayhem found success in Stage 4, when the league implemented a 2-2-2 role lock, as they were able to win four of their final five matches.

Preceding offseason

Player re-signings 
From August 1 to September 9, 2018, all Overwatch League teams that competed in the 2018 season could choose to extend their team's players' contracts. After a disappointing season, Mayhem retained three of their nine players, releasing Andreas "Logix" Berghmans, Tim "Manneten" Bylund, Johan "CWoosH" Klingestedt, Sebastian "Zebbosai" Olsson, Aleksi "Zuppeh" Kuntsi, and Joonas "zappis" Alakurtti.

Free agency 
All non-expansion teams could not enter the free agency period until October 8; they were able to sign members from their respective academy team and make trades until then. On September 11, when Mayhem acquired Koo "xepheR" Jae-mo from Seoul Dynasty. Mayhem promoted HyeonWoo "HaGoPeun" Jo and Damon "Apply" Conti from Mayhem Academy on September 21 and 24, respectively.

Florida made three free agency signings on October 15, signing Junsu "Kris" Choe, Sangbum "bqb" Lee, and Sangwon "SWoN" Yoon.

Regular season 
The Mayhem opened their season on February 15 with a match against the Atlanta Reign; Florida was swept 0–4 in the match. The following week, Mayhem announced the signing of flex tank Caleb "McGravy" McGarvey. Florida struggles throughout the stage, finishing with a 1–6 record.

One day prior to their first match of Stage 2, Florida announced its plan to implement an all-Korean roster, citing that there were "multiple issues with communication and overall team synergy, in part due to the lack of a common language among players and coaching staff." As such, Mayhem released head coach Vytis "Mineral" Lasaitis and assistant coach Jung "Yeah" Young-su; additionally, all non-Korean players (Kevyn "TviQ" Lindström, Damon "Apply" Conti, and Caleb "McGravy" McGarvey) were inactive for the entirety of Stage 2. The team did not perform well in Stage 2, losing all seven of their matches. After the end of Stage 2, Mayhem made several roster moves. Mayhem traded Caleb "Mcgravy" McGarvy and Mayhem Academy players Russell "FCTFCTN" Campbell and Johannes "Shax" Nielsen to Los Angeles Valiant in exchange for Koo "Fate" Pan-seung on May 10, signed Lee "Byrem" Seong-ju on May 13, released Damon "Apply" Conti on May 29, and released Kevyn "TviQ" Lindström and Kim "SNT" Sung-hoon on June 2.

In Stage 3, Florida's all-Korean roster overhaul continued. The team signed support Park "RaiN" Jae-ho from Overwatch Contenders team O2 Blast on June 17, and two days later, they signed three players from Korean Contenders team Armament Esports: off-tank Lee "Gargoyle" Beom-jun, flex DPS Choi "DPI" Yong-joon, and main tank Choi "Karayan" San-ha. Additionally, the team signed three staff members: head coach Oh "Unread" Nam-hun, assistant coach Kim "KH1" Hyung-il, and analyst Daumantas "RyuuTsubasa" Krugliakovas. Florida defeated the Houston Outlaws, 3–1, in the third week of Stage 3 to claim their second win of the season and snapped their 15-game losing streak. Looking to carry that momentum into week four, Florida took on the Hangzhou Spark on June 29. The match saw the debut of Florida's Gargoyle and DPI, but the team was ultimately swept 0–4 by the Spark, who set the record for the fastest completion of Eichenwalde at 4 minutes and 12 seconds in the process. The team ended Stage 3 with a 1–6 record.

Although not announced at the time, the team mutually parted ways with head coach Unread at some point in Stage 4. The Mayhem's first match of Stage 4, along with the first match with an enforced 2-2-2 role lock by the League, was against the Vancouver Titans on July 28, and were swept 0–4. The loss marked the fourth match in a row in which Mayhem had failed to secure a map win. Florida defeated the Washington Justice and Toronto Defiant to claim their first back-to-back victories of season. The Mayhem ended the Stage with a 3–4 record.

Final roster

Transactions 
Transactions of/for players on the roster during the 2019 regular season:
On February 22, Mayhem signed Caleb "Mcgravy" McGarvy.
On May 10, Mayhem traded Caleb "Mcgravy" McGarvy, Russell "FCTFCTN" Campbell, and Johannes "Shax" Nielsen to Los Angeles Valiant in exchange for Koo "Fate" Pan-seung.
On May 13, Mayhem signed Lee "Byrem" Seong-ju.
On May 29, Mayhem released Damon "Apply" Conti.
On June 2, Mayhem released Kevyn "TviQ" Lindström and Kim "SNT" Sung-hoon.
On June 17, Mayhem signed Park "RaiN" Jae-ho.
On June 19, Mayhem signed Lee "Gargoyle" Beom-jun, Choi "DPI" Yong-joon, and Choi "Karayan" San-ha.

Standings

Record by stage

League

Game log

Awards 
On May 8, Ha "Sayaplayer" Jeong-Woo was named as a reserve for the 2019 Overwatch League All-Star Game.

Notes

References 

2019 Overwatch League seasons by team
Florida Mayhem
Florida Mayhem seasons